San Francisco Express Times was a counterculture tabloid underground newspaper edited by Marvin Garson and published weekly in San Francisco, California from January 24, 1968, to March 25, 1969, for a total of 62 issues, covering and promoting radical politics, rock music, arts and progressive culture in the Bay Area. It was a member of the Underground Press Syndicate, and sold for 15 cents.

Starting in April 1969 the San Francisco Express Times changed its name to Good Times, publishing under that title with a substantially different editorial policy, lasting until July 21, 1972.

Express Times publication history 
Marvin Garson was a graduate of the University of California and veteran of the Berkeley Free Speech Movement, where he edited an FSM newsletter, Wooden Shoe, along with his wife Barbara Garson. He started the Express Times with co-founder Bob Novick and participation by David Lance Goines, Alice Waters and others. Regular contributors included Todd Gitlin, Greil Marcus, Paul Williams, Sandy Darlington, and Marjorie Heins. Staff photographers were Jeffrey Blankfort followed by Nacio Jan Brown and Robert Altman. Artwork was provided by Jaxon, along with the syndicated editorial cartoons of Ron Cobb. During the year of its existence highlights included extensive on-the-scene coverage of student rioting and the prolonged strike at San Francisco State University, and Lenny Heller's serialized novel of guerrilla warfare in the United States, Berkeley Guns.

Documents released under the Freedom of Information Act show that the Express Times was one of a number of underground newspapers successfully infiltrated by the FBI, which had a paid informant on the staff.

In December 1968 editor Marvin Garson spent 20 days in jail in Chicago as a result of his participation as a journalist in a police and protester skirmish during the Democratic National Convention in August.

Good Times publication history 

The renamed Good Times paper debuted in April 1969; the editorial collective was made up of residents of the Good Times Commune. Under this regime, the paper's contents were a good deal more relaxed. Underground cartoonist Harry Driggs served as Good Times' art director and staff cartoonist; he recruited fellow underground cartoonists Trina Robbins and Guy Colwell as contributors (Collwell, in fact, joined the Good Times Commune).

When Good Times decided to accept pornographic display and classified sex trade advertising in early 1970, feminist staff members staged an action to prevent this from happening.

The History Channel's 2009 television program MysteryQuest speculated that a member of the Good Times Commune, Richard Gaikowski (1936–2004), was a possible suspect in the unsolved San Francisco Zodiac Killer case.

See also
 List of underground newspapers of the 1960s counterculture

Notes

External links
San Francisco Express Times archive at Independent Voices
San Francisco Good Times archive at Independent Voices

1968 establishments in California
Alternative weekly newspapers published in the United States
Counterculture of the 1960s
Publications established in 1968
Publications disestablished in 1972
Underground press